Perla Bustamante Corona (born 17 August 1964) is a Paralympic athlete from Mexico competing mainly in category T42 sprint events.

Bustamante was born in Ciudad Juárez in 1964 and earned a degree in industrial engineering from the Chihuahua Institute of Technology. She lost her left leg while training for a triathlon in Puerto Vallarta in 1999.

She competed in the 2004 Summer Paralympics in Athens, Greece.  There she won a silver medal in the women's Shot put - F42-46 event and a bronze medal in the women's Long jump - F42 event.  She also competed at the 2008 Summer Paralympics in Beijing, China.    There she won a gold medal in the women's 100 metres - T42 event, finished sixth in the women's Shot put - F42-46 event and finished fourth in the women's Long jump - F42 event.

References

External links 
 

Paralympic athletes of Mexico
Athletes (track and field) at the 2004 Summer Paralympics
Athletes (track and field) at the 2008 Summer Paralympics
Paralympic gold medalists for Mexico
Paralympic silver medalists for Mexico
Paralympic bronze medalists for Mexico
1964 births
Living people
Medalists at the 2004 Summer Paralympics
Medalists at the 2008 Summer Paralympics
Paralympic medalists in athletics (track and field)
Mexican female sprinters
Mexican female long jumpers
Mexican female shot putters
Sportspeople from Ciudad Juárez
Chihuahua Institute of Technology alumni